Jeremy Frith (born 30 October 1977) is a cricketer who played for Guernsey. He played in the 2012 ICC World Cricket League Division Five tournament in Singapore. He was the leading run-scorer for Guernsey in the tournament, with 221 runs in six matches.

References

External links
 

1977 births
Living people
Guernsey cricketers
Cricketers from Epsom